The War and Treaty are an American husband and wife duo of Michael Trotter Jr. and Tanya Trotter.

Career
Based in Albion, Michigan, Trotter & (Blount) Trotter was formed in 2014.  They changed their name to The War and Treaty in 2017 after fighting about changing their name for a fifth time. During the argument Tanya yells out “this isn’t war Michael, so let’s come to some sort of treaty here.”  In 2016, Michael Trotter Jr. and Tanya Blount released the duet album Love Affair as Trotter & Blount. In the same year, the duo released the single "Hi Ho" as The War and Treaty.  "Hi Ho" was described by Paste writer Chris Estey as 'the break out soul hit'.  In 2017, The War and Treaty released the EP Down to the River, described as a mix of 'blues, gospel, soul, bluegrass, country' and heralded by Estey as 'a splendidly made immediate classic about conflict and redemption'. Estey describes 'in songs about personal turmoil and the dread at the end of time, every kind of fear and joy is addressed through gut-stirring and feet-moving anthems like "Hit Dawg Will Holla", "Set My Soul On Fire", and the title track. Yet the two can sensually help heal the wounds from those confessional blasts with a sweet ballad like "Till The Mornin’" — they truly live up to the dynamic tension of their moniker.'

In 2018, Rolling Stone reported The War and Treaty's debut album Healing Tide is due for release on August 10, 2018, describing the lead single as a 'joyfully relentless title track, reminiscent of classic Ike and Tina Turner rock-infused soul'.

On September 25, 2020, The War and Treaty released their sophomore studio album, Hearts Town, on Rounder Records. On April 18, 2021 they joined Dierks Bentley for a performance of U2's "Pride (In the Name of Love)" for the 56th Academy of Country Music Awards.

The group signed a major label deal with Universal Music Group Nashville in May 2022. They performed a cover of "It's Only Rock 'n Roll (But I Like It)" alongside Brothers Osborne at the 56th Annual Country Music Association Awards on November 9, 2022 and surprise-released their second EP Blank Page on the same day.

Discography

Studio albums

EPs

Singles

Awards and nominations

Michael Trotter

References

External links
Official website
 The War and Treaty on Facebook
 The War and Treaty on Twitter

American musical duos
Musical groups established in 2014
Albion, Michigan
2014 establishments in Michigan
Thirty Tigers artists